Lectionary 71, designated by siglum ℓ 71 (in the Gregory-Aland numbering). It is a Greek manuscript of the New Testament, on vellum leaves. It is dated by a colophon to the year 1066.

Description 

The codex contains Lessons from the Gospels of John, Matthew, Luke lectionary (Evangelistarium) with some lacunae supplemented on paper. It is written in Greek minuscule letters, on 159 parchment leaves, 2 columns per page, 25-27 lines per page. 
It contains subscriptions.

History 

The manuscript was written by presbyter John for monk Georg. 

It was partially examined by Scholz. It was examined and described by Paulin Martin and Henri Omont.

The manuscript is not cited in the critical editions of the Greek New Testament (UBS3).

Currently the codex is located in the Bibliothèque nationale de France (Gr. 289) in Paris.

See also 

 List of New Testament lectionaries
 Biblical manuscript
 Textual criticism

Notes and references

Bibliography 

 Henri Omont, Fac-similés des manuscrits grecs dates de la Bibliothèque Nationale du IXe et XIVe siècle (Paris, 1891), 32. 

Greek New Testament lectionaries
11th-century biblical manuscripts
Bibliothèque nationale de France collections